

Main affluents
{| class="wikitable" style="padding:6px; spacing:6px; background:#eff;"
|-
! style="text-align:center;" colspan="6"| The main affluents of North Sea, Skagerrak and Kattegat
|-
| Name || MeanDischarge || Length || Basin || States || Course
|-
| Rhine || 2900 m³/s(R-M-delta)2300 m³/s   (proper)  || 1238.8 km (with Hinterrhein)1240 km (with Vorderrhein)|| (with Meuse) ||Switzerland (sources), Liechtenstein, Austria, Germany, France, Netherlands,Luxembourg (Moselle), Italy (Reno di Lei) || '''smallest flow': Dischmabach → Landwasser → Albula → Hinterrhein (sum = 72 km) → Rhinelongest course: Rein da Medel → Vorderrhein (sum = 74 km)→ Rhine
|-
| Elbe ||   870 m³/s || 1094 km (nominally) 1245 km (hydrologically) || || the Czech Republic (sources), Germany, Austria (Lainsitz), Poland (Dzika Orlica and smaller affluents) || longer and larger tributary Vltava
|-
| Glomma ||   698 m³/s ||   601 km ||    || Norway, Sweden (affluents) || Glomma → lake Aursunden → Glomma → Skagerrak
|-
| Göta älv ||   575 m³/s ||     93 km (nominally)   720 km (hydrologically) ||    || Sweden, Norway (Trysilelva)|| Rogen → lake Femund → Trysilelva → Klarälven → lake Vänern → Göta älv → Kattegat
|-
| IJssel ||     380 m³/s (75% from Rhine)||   125 km (nominally)     188 km (with Oude IJssel)||    || Netherlands, Germany (source Oude IJssel) || Oude IJssel → IJssel → Ketelmeer → IJsselmeer → Wadden Sea
|-
| Meuse ||   357 m³/s ||   874 km ||    ||France (source), Belgium, Netherlands,Luxembourg (Chiers), Germany (Rur, S(ch)walm, Niers) || sharing mouths of the Rhine
|-
| Weser ||   327 m³/s ||   451.4 km (nominally)    751 km (with Werra) ||    || Germany || formed by confluence of Werra (longer) and Fulda (larger)
|-
| Drammenselva ||   314 m³/s ||     48 km (nominally)   301 km (system) ||    || Norway || … → Slidrefjorden → Strondafjorden → Aurdalsfjorden → Begna → Sperillen → Ådalselva → Randselva → Storelva→ Tyrifjorden → Drammenselva → Oslofjord
|-
| Humber(estuary) ||   250 m³/s (without tide flows)  ||     62 km (nominally)   359 km (with Trent) ||    || England || common estuary of Trent and Ouse (see below)
|-
| Tay ||   170 m³/s ||   193 km ||   || Scotland || River Tay → Firth of Tay (estuary, included in the figures) 
|-
| Otra ||   150 m³/s ||   245 km ||    || Norway || → Skagerrak
|-
| Sira ||   130 m³/s ||   152 km ||    || Norway ||
|-
| Scheldt ||   127 m³/s ||   360 km ||   || France (source), Belgium, Netherlands (estuary) || 
|-
| River Forth ||   112 m³/s ||     47 km (nominally)     55 km (hydrologically) ||   The catchment area of both the River Forth and Firth of Forth Estuary. || Scotland || → Firth of Forth
|-
| Numedalslågen ||   111 m³/s ||   352 km ||    || Norway || → Skagerrak
|-
| Trent ||     99 m³/s ||   297 km ||    || England || → Humber (see above)
|-
| Tweed ||     85 m³/s ||   156 km ||    || Scotland (source), England ||
|-
| Lagan ||     82 m³/s ||   244 km ||    || Sweden || → Kattegat
|-
| Ems ||     80.5 m³/s ||   371 km ||   || Germany, Netherlands (estuary)|| 
|-
| Thames ||     65.8 m³/s ||   346 km ||   || England || 
|-
| Spey ||     64 m³/s ||   173 km ||   || Scotland || → Moray Firth
|-
| Ätran ||     52.5 m³/s ||   243 km ||    || Sweden || → Kattegat
|-
| Zwarte Water ||     50 m³/s ||   19 km (nominally)  201 km (with Vecht)||    || Germany (source), Netherlands || Vecht/Vechte → Zwarte Water → Zwarte Meer → IJsselmeer → Wadden Sea 
|-
| River Tyne ||     44.6 m³/s ||   321.4 km ||    || England ||
|-
| Yorkshire Ouse ||     44 m³/s ||   208 km (with Ure)||    || England || Ure → Ouse → Humber (see above)
|-
| Nissan ||     41 m³/s ||   200 km ||    || Sweden || → Kattegat
|-
| Skjern Å ||     36.6 m³/s ||     94 km ||    || Denmark ||→ Ringkøbing Fjord (lagoon)
|-
| Great Ouse ||     35 m³/s ||   270 km ||    || England || →  The Wash
|-
| Gudenå ||  32.4 m³/s||     149 km ||   ||  Denmark || → Kattegat
|}

Long list

Austrian drainage basinElbe (near Cuxhaven, Germany) Vltava (in Mělník, Czech Republic)
Lužnice/Lainsitz (in Týn nad Vltavou, Czech Republic)
Rhine/Rhein (main branch at Hook of Holland, Netherlands)
Bregenzer Ach (into Lake Constance in Bregenz)
Dornbirner Ach (into Lake Constance near Bregenz)
Ill (near Feldkirch)

Belgian drainage basin
Yser (in Nieuwpoort) – France, Belgium

Danish drainage basins
Gudenå (into Kattegat near Randers)
Skjern Å (near Skjern)

English drainage basins

Flowing into the North Sea – Thames and MedwayFrom Foreness Point to Shoeburyness River Medway (shares the Thames estuary)
 River Beult
 River Teise
 River Bewl
 River Eden, Kent
 River Bourne, Kent
 River Len
 Loose Stream
 East Malling Stream
 Wateringbury Stream
 River Thames (From Oxford up to its source, the Thames is also known as the River Isis)
 River Darent
 River Cray
 River Shuttle
 Wyncham Stream
 River Ingrebourne (tidal reach known as Rainham Creek)
 River Beam (downstream name for River Rom)
 The Ravensbourne 
 River Roding (tidal reach known as Barking Creek)
 River Lea (or Lee)
 River Moselle (mostly subterranean, original tributary of Lee, now empties into Pymme's Brook)
 The Hackney Brook (subterranean, and probably now diverted to the Thames)
 River Beane
 River Rib
 River Mimram
 River Ravensbourne (tidal reach known as Deptford Creek)
 Spring Brook
 River Pool
 River Beck
 Chaffinch Brook
 River Quaggy (upper reaches known as Kyd Brook)
Quaggy Hither Green
Middle Kid Brooke
Lower Kid Brooke
Little Quaggy
Fairy Hall Flow
Grove Park Ditch
Milk Street Ditch
East Branch
Main Branch
 River Neckinger (See also Subterranean rivers of London for this and the others marked 'subterranean' below)
 Walbrook (subterranean)
 River Fleet (subterranean, also known as the Holbourne)
 River Effra (subterranean)
 River Tyburn (subterranean)
 Falconbrook (subterranean)
 River Westbourne (subterranean)
 Tyburn Brook (subterranean)
 Counter's Creek (subterranean)
 River Wandle
 River Graveney
 Beverley Brook
 Pyl Brook
 Stamford Brook (subterranean – tidal reach known as Hammersmith Creek)
 Bollar or Bollo Brook (subterranean)
 River Brent
 Dollis Brook
 Duke of Northumberland's River
 River Crane
 Hogsmill River
 The Rythe
 River Ember
 River Mole
 Longford River
 River Ash
 River Wey
 River Tillingbourne
 River Ock, Surrey
 River Bourne, north branch
 River Bourne, south branch
 River Colne
 Wraysbury River
 Frays River
 River Pinn
 River Misbourne
 River Chess
 River Gade
 River Bulbourne
 River Ver
 Colne Brook
 The Cut
 River Wye
 River Loddon
 St Patrick's Stream
 Twyford Brook
 Emm Brook
 River Blackwater
 River Whitewater
 River Hart
 Wish Stream
 Cove Brook
 River Kennet
 Foudry Brook
 River Enborne
 River Lambourn
 River Dun
 River Og
 River Pang
 River Bourne
 River Thame
 River Ock
 River Cherwell
 River Ray
 River Swere
 River Evenlode
 River Glyme
 River Dorn
 River Windrush
 River Cole
 River Leach
 River Coln
 River Ray
 River Key
 River Churn

Flowing into the North Sea – North of the Thames EstuaryFrom Shoeburyness to St Abb's Head River Crouch
 River Roach
 Prittle Brook
 River Blackwater
 River Chelmer
 River Ter
 River Brain
 River Colne
 River Stour
 River Orwell
 River Gipping
 River Deben
 River Alde/River Ore
 Minsmere River
 River Blyth
 River Yox
 River Yare
 River Bure
 River Thurne
 River Ant
 River Waveney
River Hundred (Benacre, Kessingland
 River Chet
 River Wensum
 River Tas
 River Burn
 River Great Ouse
 Babingley River
 River Nar
 River Wissey
 River Little Ouse
 River Thet
 River Lark
 River Cam
 River Ivel
 River Hiz
 River Ouzel or Lovat
 River Tove
 River Nene
 River Ise
 Willow Brook
 River Welland
 Whaplode River
 New River
 Car Dyke (Peterborough)
 Eye Brook

 River Chater
 River Gwash
 Vernatt's Drain
 South Drove Drain
 River Glen
 West Glen River
 East Glen River
 Bourne Eau
 Risegate Eau
 Boston Haven
 South Forty-Foot Drain
 Hammond Beck
 North Forty Foot Drain
 Clay Dike
 Skerth Drain
 River Witham
 River Slea
 Billinghay Skirth
 River Brant
 Fossdyke Navigation
 River Till
 River Bain
 River Waring
 Newham Drain
 Castle Dike
 Maud Foster Drain
 West Fen Drain
 Medlam Drain
 Stone Bridge Drain
 West Fen Catchwater Drain
 East Fen Catchwater Drain
 Hobhole Drain
 Cowbridge Drain
 Bell Water Drain
 Fodder Dike
 Steeping River
 River Lymn
 Cow Bank Drain
 Saltfleet Haven
 Great Eau
 Long Eau
 Mar Dike
 South Dike
 Grainthorpe Haven
 River Lud Canalised and diverted as Louth Navigation.
 Tetney Haven
 Louth Navigation
 Waithe Beck
 River Humber
 Buck Beck
 River Freshney
 East Halton Beck
 The Beck
 River Ancholme
 West Drain
 Halton Drain
 River Trent
 Pauper's Drain
 River Torne
 River Eau
 River Idle
 River Maun
 River Meden
 River Ryton
 River Devon
 River Greet
 River Leen
 River Erewash
 River Soar
 River Wreake
 River Sence
 River Derwent
 River Amber
 River Wye
 River Lathkill
 River Bradford
 River Noe
 River Ashop
 River Alport
 River Westend
 River Dove
 River Manifold
 River Hamps
 River Tame
 River Blythe
 River Cole
 River Rea
 River Anker
 River Sow
 River Penk
 River Ouse
 Swinefleet Warping Drain
 River Don
 River Rother
 River Doe Lea
 River Hipper
 River Drone
 River Sheaf
 Porter Brook
 Meers Brook
 River Rivelin
 River Loxley
 River Little Don
 River Dearne
 River Dove
 River Went
 River Aire
 River Worth
 River Calder
 River Colne
 River Holme
 River Hebble
 River Derwent
 River Rye
 River Seven
 River Dove
 River Riccal
 River Hertford
 River Wharfe
 River Dibb
 River Skirfare
 River Washburn
 River Foss
 River Nidd
 River Ure
 River Swale
 Cod Beck
 River Wiske
 River Cover
 River Bain
 River Hull
 Sands Drain
 Winestead Drain
 Gypsey Race
 Sea Cut (Scalby Beck)
 River Esk
Iburndale Beck
Little Beck
May Beck
 Skelton Beck
 River Tees
 River Leven
 River Skerne
 River Greta
 River Balder
 River Lune
 River Wear
 River Browney
 River Deerness
 River Gaunless
 River Tyne
 River South Tyne
 River Allen
 River East Allen
 River West Allen
 Haltwhistle Burn
 River North Tyne
 Warks Burn
 Chirdon Burn
 Lewis Burn
 Devil's Water
 River Derwent
 River Team
 River Blyth
 River Wansbeck
 River Font
 River Coquet
 River Aln
 River Tweed
 Whiteadder Water, Scotland
 Blackadder Water, Scotland
 River Till
 River Glen
 Eden Water, Scotland
 River Teviot, Scotland
 Leader Water, Scotland
 Gala Water, Scotland
 Ettrick Water, Scotland
 Leithen Water, Scotland
 Quair Water, Scotland
 Eddleston Water, Scotland
 Manor Water, Scotland
 Holms Water, Scotland

French drainage basin

The Aa is an 89 km long river in northern France. Its source is near the village Bourthes. It flows through the départements and cities of Pas-de-Calais: Saint-Omer and Nord: Gravelines.
Aa (in Gravelines)

German drainage basin

The three main rivers in Germany are the Rhine (main tributaries including the Neckar, the Main and the Moselle (Mosel)); the Elbe (also drains into the North Sea); and, the Danube (Donau).

German rivers draining into the North Sea
The rivers in this section are sorted south-west (Netherlands) to east (Danish border).Meuse  (main branch at Stellendam, Netherlands)
Niers (in Gennep, Netherlands)
Rur/Roer (in Roermond, Netherlands)
Wurm (near Heinsberg)
Inde (in Jülich)
Rhine/Rhein (main branch at Hook of Holland, Netherlands)
Lippe (in Wesel)
Alme (in Paderborn)
Emscher (near Dinslaken)
Ruhr (in Duisburg)
Volme (near Hagen)
Lenne (near Hagen)
Möhne (in Neheim-Hüsten)
Erft (in Neuss)
Wupper/Wipper (in Leverkusen)
Sieg (in Bonn)
Agger (in Siegburg)
Nister (in Wissen)
Ahr (near Sinzig)
Wied (in Neuwied)
Mehrbach (near Asbach)
Aubach (in Neuwied)
Engelsbach (Aubach) (in Neuwied)
Moselle (in Koblenz)
Elzbach (in Moselkern)
Alf (in Alf) 
Lieser (near Bernkastel-Kues)
Salm (near Klüsserath)
Kyll (near Trier-Ehrang)
Saar (near Konz)
Nied (near Rehlingen-Siersburg)
Prims (in Dillingen)
Blies (in Sarreguemines)
Schwarzbach (near Zweibrücken)
Sauer (in Wasserbillig)
Prüm (near Echternach)
Nims (in Irrel)
Our (in Wallendorf)
Lahn (in Lahnstein)
Aar (in Diez)
Weil (in Weilburg)
Dill (in Wetzlar)
Ohm (in Cölbe)
Nahe (in Bingen)
Alsenz (near Bad Kreuznach)
Glan (near Bad Sobernheim)
Selz (in Ingelheim)
Main (in Mainz)
Nidda (in Frankfurt-Höchst)
Wetter (in Niddatal)
Kinzig (in Hanau)
Tauber (in Wertheim am Main)
Franconian Saale (in Gemünden am Main)
Regnitz (in Bamberg)
Pegnitz (in Fürth)
Rednitz (in Fürth)
Franconian Rezat (in Georgensgmünd)
Swabian Rezat (in Georgensgmünd)
Itz (in Baunach)
Red Main (near Kulmbach)
Neckar (in Mannheim)
Jagst (near Bad Friedrichshall) 
Kocher (in Bad Friedrichshall) 
Enz (in Besigheim)
Murr (in Marbach am Neckar)
Rems (in Remseck)
Fils (in Plochingen)
Queich (near Germersheim)
Pfinz (near Germersheim)
Lauter (in Lauterbourg)
Murg (near Rastatt)
Sauer (in Seltz, France)
Acher (near Lichtenau)
Rench (near Lichtenau)
Kinzig (near Kehl)
Elz (near Lahr)
Wiese (near Basel)
Wutach (in Waldshut-Tiengen)IJssel (into the IJsselmeer near Kampen, Netherlands) 
Berkel (in Zutphen, Netherlands) 
Oude IJssel/Issel (in Doesburg, Netherlands)Zwarte Water (into the IJsselmeer near Genemuiden, Netherlands)
Vechte (near Zwolle, Netherlands)
Dinkel (in Neuenhaus)
Ems (near Delfzijl, Netherlands)
Hase (in Meppen)
Weser (near Bremerhaven) 
Hunte (in Elsfleth)
Lesum (in Bremen-Vegesack)
Wümme (in Ritterhude)
Aller (near Verden (Aller))
Böhme (near Rethem)
Leine (near Schwarmstedt)
Innerste (near Sarstedt)
Rhume (in Northeim)
Oder (Harz) (in Katlenburg-Lindau)
Örtze (in Winsen an der Aller)
Fuhse (in Celle)
Oker (in Müden (Aller))
Schunter (near Braunschweig)
Werre (in Bad Oeynhausen)
Diemel (in Bad Karlshafen)
Fulda (in Hannoversch Münden)
Eder (in Edermünde)
Schwalm (near Fritzlar)
Haune (in Bad Hersfeld)
Werra (in Hannoversch Münden)
Hörsel (near Eisenach)
Ulster (in Philippsthal)

Elbe (near Cuxhaven) 
Oste (near Otterndorf)
Stör (near Glückstadt)
Alster (in Hamburg)
Bille (near Hamburg)
Ilmenau (near Winsen (Luhe))
Jeetzel (in Hitzacker)
Löcknitz (near Dömitz)
Elde (near Lenzen)
Aland (in Schnackenburg)
Stepenitz (in Wittenberge)
Havel (near Havelberg)
Dosse (near Havelberg)
Rhin (near Warnau)
Plane (near Brandenburg)
Nuthe (in Potsdam)
Spree (in Berlin-Spandau)
Dahme (in Berlin-Köpenick)
Ohre (near Magdeburg)
Saale (in Barby)
Bode (in Nienburg (Saale))
Wipper (Saale) (near Bernburg)
White Elster (near Halle (Saale))
Parthe (in Leipzig)
Pleiße (in Leipzig)
Weida (near Gera)
Unstrut (near Naumburg)
Wipper (Unstrut) (near Heldrungen)
Gera (in Straußfurt)
Ilm (in Großheringen)
Schwarza (in Schwarza)
Mulde (in Dessau)
Zwickauer Mulde (near Colditz)
Chemnitz (near Wechselburg)
Freiberger Mulde (near Colditz)
Zschopau (near Döbeln)
Black Elster (near Wittenberg)
Weißeritz (in Dresden)
Wilde Weißeritz (in Freital)
Wesenitz (in Pirna)
Ohře/Eger (in Litoměřice, Czech Republic)Vltava (in Mělník, Czech Republic)Berounka (near Prague, Czech Republic)
Mže/Mies (in Pilsen, Czech Republic)
Eider (in Tönning)
Treene (in Friedrichstadt)

Netherlands drainage basin
Zwarte Water (into IJsselmeer near Genemuiden) – Netherlands
Vecht (Overijssel)/Vechte (near Zwolle)
Regge (near Ommen)
Dinkel (in Neuenhaus)
IJssel (into IJsselmeer near Kampen) – Netherlands
Berkel (in Zutphen)
Oude IJssel (in Doesburg)
branch of the river Rhine (near Pannerden)

Rhine/Rhein (main branch at Hook of Holland) – Switzerland, Liechtenstein, Austria, Germany, France, Belgium, Netherlands
Linge (in Gorinchem)
Lippe (in Wesel)
Emscher (near Dinslaken)
Ruhr (in Duisburg)
Lenne (near Hagen)
Düssel (in Düsseldorf)
Erft (in Neuss)
Wupper (in Leverkusen)
Sieg (in Bonn)
Ahr (near Sinzig)
Wied (in Neuwied)
Mehrbach (near Asbach)
Aubach (in Neuwied)
Engelsbach (Aubach) (in Neuwied)
Moselle (in Koblenz)
Kyll (near Trier-Ehrang)
Ruwer (near Trier-Ruwer)
Saar (near Konz)
Nied (near Rehlingen-Siersburg)
Sauer (in Wasserbillig)
Prüm (near Echternach)
Our (in Wallendorf)
Alzette (in Ettelbruck)
Seille (in Metz)
Meurthe (in Frouard)
Madon (in Neuves-Maisons)
Vologne (near Éloyes)
Moselotte (in Remiremont)
Lahn (in Lahnstein)
Ohm (in Cölbe)
Nahe (in Bingen)
Main (in Mainz)
Nidda (in Frankfurt-Höchst)
Kinzig (in Hanau)
Tauber (in Wertheim am Main)
Franconian Saale (in Gemünden)
Regnitz (in Bamberg)
Pegnitz (river) (in Fürth)
Rednitz (in Fürth)
Neckar (in Mannheim)
Jagst (near Bad Friedrichshall)
Kocher (in Bad Friedrichshall)
Enz (in Besigheim)
Fils (in Plochingen)
Lauter (in Lauterbourg)
Murg (near Rastatt)
Ill (near Strasbourg)
Kinzig (near Kehl)
Elz (near Lahr)
Wiese (in Basel)
Aare (in Koblenz)
Limmat (in Brugg)
Reuss (in Brugg)
Emme (near Solothurn)
Saane/Sarine (near Bern)
Thur (near Schaffhausen)
Ill (near Feldkirch)
Vorderrhein (near Chur)
Hinterrhein (near Chur)

Meuse/Maas'' (main branch near Hellevoetsluis) – France, Belgium, Netherlands
Dieze (near 's-Hertogenbosch)
Aa (in 's-Hertogenbosch)
Dommel (in 's-Hertogenbosch)
Niers (in Gennep)
Swalm (in Swalmen)
Rur/Roer (in Roermond)
Wurm (near Heinsberg)
Inde (in Jülich)
Geul (near Meerssen)
Jeker/Geer (in Maastricht)
Ourthe (in Liège)
Vesdre (near Liège)
Amblève (in Comblain-au-Pont)
Salm (in Trois-Ponts)
Sambre (in Namur)
Lesse (in Dinant-Anseremme)
Viroin (in Vireux-Molhain)
Semois/Semoy (in Monthermé)
Bar (near Dom-le-Mesnil)
Chiers (in Bazeilles)

Scheldt/Schelde/Escaut (near Vlissingen) – France, Belgium, Netherlands
Rupel (in Rupelmonde)
Nete (in Rumst)
Dijle (in Rumst)
Zenne (in Mechelen)
Demer (in Rotselaar)
Durme (in Temse)
Dender (in Dendermonde)
Mark (near Lessines)
Leie (in Ghent)
Deûle (in Deûlémont)
Scarpe (Mortagne-du-Nord)
Haine (in Condé-sur-l'Escaut)

Norwegian drainage basin
Otta (in Oppland into Gudbrandsdalslågen at Otta)
Gudbrandsdalslågen (into Lake Mjøsa in Oppland)
Vorma (out of Lake Mjøsa into Glomma at Årnes)
Glomma (into Oslofjord at Fredrikstad)
Renaelva (in Hedmark into Glomma at Åmot)
Numedalslågen (in Larvik, Vestfold)
Hallingdalselva (through Hallingdal into Lake Krøderen, Buskerud)
Begna (in Buskerud)
Dramselva (into Oslofjord in Drammen, Buskerud)
Skien (into Møsvatn, Telemark)
Tinn (into Møsvatn, Telemark)
Nidelva (in Arendal, Aust-Agder)
Otra (in Kristiansand, Vest-Agder)

Scotland drainage basin
Tyne (near Dunbar)
Tay (near Dundee)
Dee (in Aberdeen)
Don (in Aberdeen)
Ythan (in Newburgh, Aberdeenshire)
Spey (near Elgin)

Swedish drainage basin
Göta älv (into Kattegat in Gothenburg) 
Lake Vänern
Klarälven/Trysilelva (into Vänern near Karlstad)
Viskan (into Kattegat near Varberg)
Ätran (into Kattegat in Falkenberg)
Nissan (into Kattegat in Halmstad)
Lagan (into Kattegat near Laholm)

Switzerland drainage basin
The Rhine, together with its tributaries the Aare and the Thur drain about two thirds of the water into the North Sea.

See also
Drainage basin
European river zonation
Geography of Europe
Geography of Germany
Geography of the North Sea
Geography of Switzerland
List of European rivers with alternative names
Latin names of European rivers
List of rivers of England

References

North Sea

Rivers of Europe